White Wolves III: Cry of the White Wolf is a 2000 American coming-of-age survival drama film and the last sequel to A Cry in the Wild.

Plot
Two teenagers are stranded in the wilds of  Northern Canada after a plane crash and they must call upon an ancient Native American spirit of a legendary white wolf to help them survive.

Cast
Mick Cain - Jack
Mercedes McNab - Pamela
Rodney A. Grant - Quentin
Margaret Howell - Irene
Robin Clarke - Mr. Patterson
Tracey Brooks Swope - Mrs. Patterson
Frederick Dawson - Frank
David Campbell - Nick

References

External links

Films about wolves
2000 films